The 2022 USA Outdoor Track and Field Championships were held in Eugene, Oregon organized by USA Track and Field. It was serving as the national championships in track and field for the United States.

The results of the event determined qualification for the 2022 World Athletics Championships, also held in Eugene. Provided they had achieved the World standard or are in the World Athletics ranking quota, the top three athletes in each event gained a place on the World team. In the event that a leading athlete did not hold the standard, or an athlete withdrew, the next highest finishing athlete with the standard was selected instead. USA Track and Field announced their World Championship roster based on these guidelines in July 2022. The results determined qualification for the 2022 NACAC Championships and the team was announced on 12 August 2022.

The selection events for the men's and women's marathon were held 2021 Boston Marathon, 2021 Chicago Marathon and 2021 New York marathon, the trials for the men's 35 km race walk were held on January 16, 2022, at San Diego Christian College and the Santee Town Center station in Santee, California and the trials for the 20 km race walk were held on February 6, 2022, at Cuyamaca College. The USATF Multi Event Championships (Heptathlon & Decathlon) occurred May 6-7, 2022 at the University of Arkansas’ John McDonnell Field in Fayetteville, Arkansas and 10,000 meter races were held at University of Oregon' Hayward Field in Eugene on May 27th, 2022.

Men's results

Men track and road events

Notes
* John Gregorek Jr. will represent Team USA in the 1500 meters - Jonathan Davis is not in the top 45 of the World Rankings & did not achieve the 2022 World Athletics Championships standard.

** Kenny Bednarek will represent Team USA in the 200 meters - Noah Lyles will enter the World Championships via wildcard as the reigning World Champion.

Men field events

Notes
* Reggie Jagers III will represent Team USA in the discus - Dallin Shurts is not in the top 32 of the World Rankings & did not achieve the 2022 World Athletics Championships standard.

** Tripp Piperi will represent Team USA in the shot put after the 4th place in the shot put. Ryan Crouser, Joe Kovacs, & Josh Awotunde will represent Team USA in the shot put.

*** Marquis Dendy and Will Wiliiams will represent Team USA in the long jump. Jeremiah Davis & Rayvon Grey are not in the top 32 world rankings and do not have the standard.

ặ Darius Carbin will represent Team USA in the high jump. Dontavious Hill is not in the top 32 world ranking and did not earned the 2022 World Athletics Championships standard.

ḃ Tim Glover will represent Team USA in the javelin. Marc Anthony Minichello is not in the top 32 world ranking and did not earn the 2022 World Athletics Championships standard.

Women's results
Key:

Women track and road events

Note

* - Molly Seidel withdrew on July 1, 2022 due to a sacral stress reaction.   Keira D'Amato, the first alternate, will compete in her place. 

ά - Robyn Stevens and Miranda Melville will represent Team USA in the 20 km race walk. Katie Burnett, Celina Lepe, Anali Cisneros  are not in the top 60 world ranking and did not earn the 2022 World Athletics Championships standard.

Women field events

Notes
* - Gabriela Leon will represent Team USA in the pole vault. Alina McDonald will not represent Team USA because the World Championship Final is on Sunday July 17 and she has not and won't compete on Sundays for religious reasons.

** - Ashtin Mahler & Michelle Atherley did not earn the World Athletics standard, so Erica Bougard & Kendell Williams will represent Team USA July 17-18 at 2022 World Athletics Championships. Michelle Atherley won 2022 NACAC Combined Events Championships May 14-15th in Ottawa and qualified by designated competition to represent Team USA at 2022 World Athletics Championships in Eugene, Oregon.

Schedule

Qualification
USA Track & Field sets minimum performances standards for entry into the national championships. In order to merit entry into the championships, an athlete must meet that standard, or better, within a set time frame prior to the competition.

All qualifying performances for the U.S. Olympic Trials must be attained on a standard outdoor track in the period
 Tuesday, June 1, 2021, through Sunday, June 12, 2022,

or on an indoor track, in the same event, in the period 
 Wednesday, December 1, 2020, through Sunday, June 12, 2022;

or on a 20 km Race Walks whose qualifying period is from
 Wednesday, December 1, 2020, through Sunday, January 24, 2022;

except for the Decathlon & Heptathlon whose qualifying period is from 
 Wednesday, December 1, 2020 through Sunday, April 24, 2022;

except for the 10,000 meters whose qualifying period is from 
 Wednesday, December 1, 2020 through Sunday, May 15, 2022;

The qualifying performance for the men's 35 km Race Walk must be attained in the period 
 Monday, January 1, 2019 through Sunday, January 12, 2022.

There are also automatic qualifying criteria outside of the entry standards. Athletes who are the reigning indoor or outdoor national champion are automatically qualified to enter that event.

Qualifying marks must be attained in a 2020 U.S. Olympic Trials event. No qualifying marks will be allowed using alternate events, except for the men's Mile run as follows: An appeal to use a Mile qualifying mark for the 1500 will be accepted only if the mile mark was made during the 2021 season, from January 1, 2021, through June 19, 2022, and the mark is 3:54.00 or better.

For events over distances from 100 m to 800 m, performances will only be accepted if fully automatic timing (FAT) is used. For performances beyond that distance, FAT times are also used, but in the event that the athlete has not recorded a FAT performance, a manually recorded time may be used. There will be no adjustment for marks made at altitude. Wind-assisted performances will not be accepted for 2022 USA Outdoor Track and Field Championships qualifying.

Notes
The following are eligible for automatic selection by Team USA to 2022 World Athletics Championships.

2019 World Athletics Championships Champions
 Christian Coleman, 100 m
 Noah Lyles, 200 m
 Donavan Brazier, 800 m
 Grant Holloway, 110 hurdles
 Sam Kendricks, Pole Vault
 Christian Taylor, Triple jump
 Joe Kovacs, Shot Put
 Nia Ali, 100 m hurdles
 Dalilah Muhammad, 400 m hurdles
 DeAnna Price, Hammer throw
2021 Diamond League Champions
 Fred Kerley, 100 m
 Kenny Bednarek, 200 m
 Michael Cherry, 400 m
 Devon Allen, 110 m hurdles
 Ryan Crouser, Shot Put
 Quanera Hayes, 400 m
 Magdalyn Ewen, Shot Put
 Valarie Allman, Discus
2021 World Athletics Combined Events Challenge Winner
 Kendell Williams, Heptathlon

References

Results
Official Results web page
USATF Combined Event Championships Fayetteville, AR - May 6-7, 2022 Decathlon Standings
USATF Combined Event Championships Fayetteville, AR - May 6-7, 2022 Heptathlon Standings

External links
Official web page WORLD ATHLETICS CHAMPIONSHIPS OREGON22 TO BE HELD JULY 15-24, 2022 at USATF
 2022 TOYOTA USATF OUTDOOR CHAMPIONSHIPS homepage USATF

USA Outdoor Track and Field Championships
US Olympic Trials
Track, Outdoor
United States Olympic Trials
USA Outdoor Track and Field Championships